Nickson Borana (born 30 January 1996) is a Papua New Guinean rugby league player who plays for Villeneuve XIII RLLG in the Elite One Championship He plays as a .

Career
Borana previously played for the Papua New Guinea Hunters in the Queensland Cup.

References

External links
Nickson Borana - Treize Mondial
Nickson Borana PNG Hunters

1996 births
Living people
Papua New Guinea Hunters players
Papua New Guinean rugby league players
Rugby league second-rows
Villeneuve Leopards players